Incredibles 2 (Original Motion Picture Soundtrack) is the soundtrack album to the 2018 film Incredibles 2, the sequel to Pixar's The Incredibles (2004). The film is directed by Brad Bird and featured musical score composed by Michael Giacchino, who also worked on the predecessor. The recording of the score began during mid-2017 and continued till May 2018, at the Sony Scoring Stage in California. The soundtrack album was released digitally, alongside the film, on June 15, by Walt Disney Records and in CDs on June 29. The soundtrack featured Giacchino's scores as well as vocalised theme songs for Mr. Incredible, Frozone, and Elastigirl featured in the credits. The digital release also featured bonus versions of the theme songs sung by Disney's a cappella group, DCappella, and their version of the track "The Glory Days" from the predecessor.

Background 
In October 2015, Bird confirmed that his regular collaborator Michael Giacchino would return to score music for the sequel. By May 2017, Giacchino began working on the film score. However, in an interview to Collider, two months later, Giacchino said that he actually had not begun writing the score, but described the score as "it'll feel like the same universe but we'll go a couple new places here and there and I think you'll be happy. It's an incredibly fun, fun, fun follow up. So I'm looking forward to seeing what comes out of it all." The scoring process delayed due to Giacchino's commitments with Spider-Man: Homecoming, War of the Planet of the Apes and Coco. In February 2018, work on the film's music began, with scoring held at Sony Scoring Stage in California. Giacchino shared few snippets from the recording sessions. Bird described on Giacchino's work as "he (Giacchino) brings a unique perspective to it and I almost think of him like another character or another actor on the film because he’s interpreting the story and he has a very good storytelling sense, so his music always has a storytelling aspect." Giacchino's brother Mick, worked on the film's additional music, and his wife Grace, also co-wrote few themes. In April 2018, Preston Elliot and Nick McIlwain of the Preston & Steve band had performed a new theme song "Elastigirl Is Back", released alongside the film's soundtrack on June 15, 2018.

Like the first film, Giacchino used jazz and orchestral music for the score. The final recording sessions happened in May 2018, consisting of a 99-piece orchestra, conducted by Gordon Goodwin, and a brass-heavy band dominating the stringe section. Joel Iwataki arranged the orchestra, enabling the big band to perform "tight and grooving". He also collaborated with Alex Lacamoire, to amuse commercial jingles for the key characters: Mr. Incredible, Elastigirl and Frozone, which were written by Giacchino and Bird. In an interview for Variety, Giacchino said that writing lyrics for the jingles "as a crazy idea "It’s as if, in that world, each of these characters had a TV show based on them and they know their own theme songs".

Reception 
The album received mixed reviews from critics. Jonathan Broxton wrote "If you like big band jazz and large, swinging orchestras in the [John] Barry/[Henry] Mancini tradition, then a great deal of The Incredibles 2 will be very entertaining. But, looking at it objectively, there are still a few little niggling issues in the finished product which stop it from being genuinely great, as opposed to merely good." Anton Smit of Soundtrack World wrote "The score itself is not very innovative since it is a continuation of the music from the first movie, but with that said, it also introduces some new melodies using the same vibe of the predecessor, like the new Elastigirl theme. There is still room for melodies, amazing build-ups to climaxes and fantastic musical patterns in action sequences."

Jim Patterson of MFiles wrote "Inevitably people will want to compare Incredibles 2 with the original score for The Incredibles since it made quite an impression with film music fans. In this respect the sequel as a stand alone album is perhaps just a tad disappointing against these high expectations. This is probably down to various factors outwith the control of the composer. The original score album benefitted from longer tracks of continuous music. The sequel with generally shorter tracks offers more disjointed listening. This is a less satisfying experience and one wonders if the album may have benefitted from having some tracks combined into suites or smaller groups."

Filmtracks.com wrote "Incredibles 2 is a wholly functional score, but it doesn't play as memorably in the film despite its often stomping personality defined by far too obvious instrumental accents. The trumpet wailing and repeated ensemble hits in super-melodramatic caper fashion are simply too saturated throughout this score for it to serve as a parody that succeeds without begging for too much attention. The movie's Screenslaver hypnotism scenes forced Disney to release warnings about possible epileptic seizures amongst those in the audience so inclined, and Giacchino's score could have the same effect on your ears. It's technically more proficient in the genre than The Incredibles, but with that maturation of the composer came a willingness to revel shamelessly in his capability."

Zanobard Reviews gave a mixed response saying "the soundtrack to The Incredibles 2 is disappointing. It relies heavily on re-using the main theme from the first film, which while not being a bad thing does limit the score. The main theme is never expanded on or built on, being exactly the same as the first film. It does also get in the way of letting the new themes shine through, as while Elastigirl’s and Screensaver’s themes are great they do not get much time on the album. The action music also sounds like a poor imitation of the first film’s and not a sequel that should by all rights (given that it is 14 years after the first) be building and expanding on the music from the first and not relying on it to boost it up."

Track listing

Personnel 
Credits adapted from CD liner notes
 Original score composed and produced by – Michael Giacchino
 Original songs produced by – Alex Lacamoire, Michael Giacchino
 Additional music – Mick Giacchino,  Daniel Farid , Grace Giacchino 
 Recording – Joel Iwataki, Keith Ukrisna, Tom Hardisty, Joey Raia
 Mixing – Joel Iwataki, Derik Lee
 Mastering – Patricia Sullivan
 Editing – Stephen M. Davis, Warren Brown, Alex Levy
 Vocalists – Alex Lacamoire, Carrie Manolakos, Michael Giacchino, Michael Mcelroy, Mykal Kilgore, Natalie Weiss
 Scoring assistants – David Coker
 Scoring crew – Brian Van Leer, David Marquette, Greg Dennen, Ryan Robinson
 Music preparation – Booker White, Curtis Green
 Music co-ordinator – Jimmy Tsai
 Digital assembly – Vincent Cirilli
 Orchestra
 Orchestration – Gordon Goodwin, Jeff Kryka
 Additional orchestration – Alex Lacamoire, Ayatey Shabazz
 Concertmaster – Alyssa Park, Belinda Broughton
 Orchestra conductor  – Marshall Bowen
 Orchestra contractor – Reggie Wilson, Connie Boylan
 Instrumentation:
 Bassoon – Kenneth Munday, Rose Corrigan 
 Cello – Steve Richards , Aniela Perry, Armen Ksajikian, Cameron Stone, Dane Little, Dermot Mulroney, Giovanna M. Clayton, John Acosta, Kevan Torfeh, Stefanie Fife, Suzie Katayama, Vahe Hayrikyan, Victor Lawrence
 Clarinet – Donald Foster , 
 Double bass – Dave Stone , Chuck Nenneker, Karl Vincent, Michael Valerio, Nico Abondolo, Norman Ludwin, Oscar Hidalgo, Trey Henry
 Drums – Bernie Dresel, Jamie Eblen
 Electric Bass – Abraham Laboriel , Richard Hammond
 Flute – Heather Clark 
 French horn – Dave Everson , Amy Jo Rhine, Amy Sanchez, Andrew Bain, Brad Warnaar, Daniel Kelley, Dylan Hart, Jenny Kim, Joe Meyer, Katelyn Faraudo, Mark Adams, Steven Becknell, Teag Reaves
 Guitar – George Doering , Michael Aarons
 Harp – Gayle Levant 
 Keyboards – Mark Levang
 Oboe – Lara Wickes 
 Percussion – Dan Greco , Alex Acuña, Emil Richards, Rolando Morales-Matos, Walter Rodriguez
 Piano – Mark Gasbarro , Alex Lacamoire
 Saxophones, woodwinds – Alex Hamlin, Dan Higgins, Don Markese, John Mitchell, John Yoakum, Neil Johnson, Sal Lozano, Steve Kujala
 Timpani – Don Williams
 Trombone – Alex Iles , Alan Kaplan, Bill Reichenbach, Francisco Torres, Jennifer Wharton, Michael Davis
 Trumpet – David Washburn , Wayne Bergeron , Brian Pareschi, Dan Fornero, Jon Lewis, Marissa Benedict, Robert Schaer, Tony Kadleck
 Tuba – Doug Tornquist , John Van Houten 
 Viola – Darrin Mccann , Alma Fernandez, Andrew Duckles, Caroline Buckman, Cassandra Lynne Richburg*, Evan Wilson, Harry Shirinian, Jorge Moraga, Karen Elaine, Karie Prescott, Leah Katz, Luke Maurer, Maria Newman, Pamela Goldsmith, Scott Hosfeld 
 Violin – Josefina Vergara , Tereza Stanislav , Aimée Kreston, Armen Anassian, Barbra Porter, Carolyn Osborn, Tina Chang Qu, Charlie Bisharat, Clayton Haslop, Darius Campo, Eun-Mee Ahn, Grace Oh, Jacqueline Brand, Jim Sitterly, Jessica Guideri, Joel Pargman, John Wittenberg, Kenneth Yerke, Kevin Kumar, Lorenz Gamma, Lucia Micarelli, Maia Jasper White, Marina Manukian, Mark Robertson, Neel Hammond, Nina Evtuhov, Peter Kent, Phillip Levy, Radu Pieptea, Roberto Cani, Roger Wilkie, Ron Clark, Sara Parkins, Sarah Thornblade, Serena McKinney, Shalini Vijayan, Songa Lee, Tamara Hatwan
 Management
 Executive producer – Tom Macdougall
 Executive director – Andrew Page
 Package design – Steve Gerdes
 Music legal affairs – Catherine Baggett
 Music business affairs – Donna Cole-Brulé
 Music production manager – Ashley Chafin

Chart performance

Accolades

References 

2018 soundtrack albums
Pixar soundtracks
Walt Disney Records soundtracks
Michael Giacchino soundtracks
Animated film soundtracks
The Incredibles